WZAC-FM is a Country formatted broadcast radio station.  The station is licensed to Danville, West Virginia and serves Madison, Logan, and Charleston in West Virginia.  WZAC-FM is owned and operated by Price Broadcasting, LLC.

References

External links
 WZAC 92.5FM Online
 

1989 establishments in West Virginia
ZAC-FM
Radio stations established in 1989
ZAC